Red Kap is an American company headquartered in Nashville, Tennessee that manufactures and distributes work-related clothing and outerwear.

In 1923, Claude H. Williams, J.G. Hayes,William Wirt Harlin, Sr. and Alexander F. Harlin founded Central Overall Manufacturing, specializing in bib overalls for men and boys.  In 1939, the name was changed to Red Kap, after Red Cap Smoking Tobacco. In 1947, Red Kap shifted focus from retail and mail order markets to development of clothing that could withstand industrial washing. Red Kap teamed up with a network of laundries to pick up, deliver, and supply fresh business uniforms.

In the 1960s, Red Kap opened the industry's first apparel research and development laboratory, went public, and became a part of Blue Bell, Inc.  In 1986, Red Kap was acquired by North Carolina-based VF Corporation (NYSE: VFC), making it the world's largest publicly held apparel company.

In the 1990s and 2000s, the brand provided apparel programs for major car companies like Ford, Honda and GM.

In 2021, Red Kap was sold to Redwood Capital Investments, LLC, and later became part of the standalone company Workwear Outfitters.

See also 
 Dickies
 Carhartt
 Cabela's

References 

Rodengen, Jeffrey L., The Legend of VF Corporation, Write Stuff Enterprises, Ft. Lauderdale, FL, 1998
2009 Red Kap catalog
2003 80th Anniversary Red Kap calendar
VF Corp: Our brands 
2008 VF Corporation Annual Report

VF Corporation
Manufacturing companies based in Nashville, Tennessee